Magnificence may refer to:

Magnificence (history of ideas)
Magnificence, one of Catherine de' Medici's court festivals in 16th-century France
Magnificence (play), 1973 play by Howard Brenton

See also
Magnificent (disambiguation)
The Magnificent (disambiguation)
The Magnificents (disambiguation)